Daiconotrechus is a genus of beetles in the family Carabidae, containing the following species:

 Daiconotrechus iwatai (Ueno, 1970)
 Daiconotrechus breviculus Ueno, 2007
 Daiconotrechus tsushimanus Ueno, 2007

References

Trechinae